Elizabeth Dupeyrón (born January 14, 1951, in Teapa, Tabasco, Mexico) is a Mexican actress.

Dupeyrón is a sister of actor Humberto Dupeyrón and aunt of actress Natasha Dupeyrón. Began her career as an actress while still a child in the movie El jinete solitario in 1958.

Filmography

References

External links 
 

1951 births
Living people
Mexican child actresses
Mexican telenovela actresses
Mexican television actresses
Mexican film actresses
Actresses from Tabasco
20th-century Mexican actresses
21st-century Mexican actresses
Mexican people of French descent